Ice hockey in Norway is a minor sport with a small following It has often had to compete with other sports for national attention.

Governing body

The Norwegian Ice Hockey Association is in charge of the ice hockey in the country. It was founded on September 18, 1934 and became a  member of the International Ice Hockey Federation on January 20, 1935.

History

Ice hockey in Norway has been played since 1930. The first official match was played on 19 February 1933 when SFK Trygg won against Sportsklubben Rapp 4-1 in a break during  WC on skates 1933 in Trondheim and Norway. On 16 September 1934, the Norwegian Ice Hockey Association was formed. The 1958 Ice Hockey World Championships in Oslo and 1999 Men's Ice Hockey World Championships were held on Norway 1 May & ; 16 May and the matches were played in Oslo (Jordal Amfi), Hamar (CC Amfi) and Lillehammer (Håkon Hall ). and  1952 i Oslo,  1994 in Lillehammer.

The sport is administered by Norwegian Ice Hockey Association (NIHF). Ice hockey in Norway is divided into the performance series (Fjordkraftligaen and 1st division) and the exercise series (2nd division and down).

Domestic Leagues

Fjordkraftligaen

Fjordkraftligaen is the top professional men's division for ice hockey in Norway and is administered by Norwegian Ice Hockey Association. In the Champions Hockey League, where sponsor names are illegal, the official name is Ligaen. The power sales company Fjordkraft has been the main sponsor of the league since the  2020/21 season. The league's name was the GET ligaen from 2007 until the name change in 2020. The series has previously had the names  Hovederien  ( 1934/35 -  1960 / 61),  1. division  ( 1961/62 -  1989/90),  Eliteserien  ( 1990/91 -  2003/04) and the UPC ligaen ( 2004 / 05 -  2006/07) and GET-Ligaen ( 2007/08 -  2019 / 20).

The Fjordkraft league consists of 10 teams that play five matches against each opponent during the season, which extends from autumn to spring. Thus, each team plays 45 matches during a season. The teams are ranked according to the number of points (three for victory in ordinary time, two for victory in overtime, one for loss in overtime, and zero for loss in ordinary time) at the end of the season. If two or more teams end up with the same score, the placement is determined by mutual results.

The winner is chosen as league champion, and qualifies together with the next seven teams for  Norwegian championship. The two weakest placed teams at the end of the season must play  qualify for the GET league  against the teams that end up in the top two places in the  1. division.

Division 1

1. men's ice hockey divisionis the second highest division in ice hockey in Norway after Fjordkraftligaen. 1st division was the name of Norwegian ice hockey's top division from 1961/62 to 1989/90, before it was named the Elite Series (1990 / 91-2003 / 04), the UPC ligaen (2004 / 05-2006 / 07), the Get Liagen (2007 / 08-2019 / 20) and Fjordkraftligaen (2020 / 21-).

To play in the 1st division, qualifying rounds must be played with the two worst in the 1st division and the two best teams in the 2nd division. Until Season 2011/12, no license was needed to play in the 1st division. The teams still had to apply Norwegian Ice Hockey Association for approval to play in the league.

Promotion 
It is not possible to move directly up to Fjordkraftligaen. The two best teams from the 1st division and the two worst from the GET-ligaen play an internal league game with home and away matches. The two teams with the most points will play in the GET-ligaen next season, while the two worst must play in the 1st division. From the 2020/21 season, the four best from the basic game in the 1st division will play internally for the two places in the qualification.

Relegation 
It is not possible to move directly down to Norwegian Second Division. The two best teams from the 2nd division and the two worst from the 1st division play an internal series game with home and away matches. The two teams with the most points will play in the 1st division next season, while the two worst must play in the 2nd division.

Norwegian Second Division 

2. men's ice hockey division is the third level in ice hockey in Norway after the GET-ligaen and  1. division.

Promotion

It's not possible to be promoted  directly to the 1st division. The two best play an internal series against the two bottom teams in 1st division games. The two best of these four teams advance.

Norwegians in the NHL

Mats Zuccarello is considered one of the most talented if not greatest Norwegian ice hockey player of all time. Only 8 Norwegians  have played in the NHL.

National team

Norway's men's national ice hockey team is the national ice hockey team of Norway, and represents the country in international ice hockey tournaments. The national team is administered by the Norwegian Ice Hockey Federation (NIHF), which was established in 1934. Norway has been a member of the International Ice Hockey Federation (IIHF) since 1935.

Norway has not won any medals in the World Championships or Olympics.
 The first international match was played in the 1937 World Cup in Great Britain, and after an initial period of moderate success, Norway lagged behind the other top nations, and from the mid-1960s they ended up permanently in the B-World Cup. Most of the 1970s and 1980s were spent in the B-WC (with some shorter stays in the C-WC), but in 1989 Norway won the B-group in the WC at home and thus moved up to the A-WC again. After relegation in 2001, Norway relegated to the top division (the former A-VM) in 2005.

Since then, Norway's results have steadily improved: Norway qualified for the quarterfinals of the Ice Hockey World Championships in  2008,  2011 and  2012, and qualified for Winter Olympics in  2010,  2014 and  2018 . Among the biggest singles matches in recent times are the victory over Canada in the 2000 World Cup, the victory over the Czech Republic in the 2010 World Cup, Sweden in the 2011 World Cup, Germany in the 2012 World Cup and the quarterfinals in 2008, 2011 and 2012.

Norway women's national ice hockey team has won a championship medal, European Championship bronze in 1993.

References